Islam is the main religion of the citizens of Kuwait and the majority of Kuwaiti citizens are Muslim; it is estimated that 70%–75% are Sunni and 25%–30% are Shias. In 2001, there were an estimated 525,000 Sunni Kuwaiti citizens and 300,000 Shia Kuwaiti citizens. In 2002, the US Department of State reported that Shias formed 30%-40% of Kuwait's citizen population, noting there were 525,000 Sunni Kuwaiti citizens and 855,000 Kuwaiti citizens in total (61% Sunnis, 39% Shias). In 2004, there were an estimated 600,000 Sunni Kuwaiti citizens, 300,000-350,000 Shia Kuwaiti citizens and 913,000 Kuwaiti citizens in total. 

Some other minor Muslim sects do exist in Kuwait's society, but in very small or rare numbers. There are no estimates of the number of non-citizen Muslims.

See also
 Religion in Kuwait
 Demographics of Kuwait

References

External Links 

 
Kuwait